Michele Radosevich (born October 7, 1947) is an American politician and lawyer.

Born in Minneapolis, Minnesota, Radosevich graduated from Marquette University in 1969. In 1976, Radosevich was elected to the Wisconsin State Senate serving from 1977 until 1981. Radosevich moved to the state of Washington and graduated from the Seattle University School of Law, in 1994, and was admitted to the Washington State Bar. Radosevich practices law in Seattle, Washington.

References

1947 births
Living people
Politicians from Minneapolis
Politicians from Seattle
Marquette University alumni
Seattle University School of Law alumni
Wisconsin state senators
Women state legislators in Wisconsin
Washington (state) lawyers
Lawyers from Minneapolis
21st-century American women